Wilfried Colling (born 12 December 1959) is a German wrestler. He competed in the men's freestyle 100 kg at the 1988 Summer Olympics.

References

1959 births
Living people
German male sport wrestlers
Olympic wrestlers of West Germany
Wrestlers at the 1988 Summer Olympics
People from Düren (district)
Sportspeople from Cologne (region)